Jelle Wallays (born 11 May 1989) is a Belgian road cyclist, who currently rides for UCI WorldTeam .

Career

Jelle Wallays is the brother and nephew of racing cyclists Jens Wallays and Luc Wallays. He was coached by his uncle in his early racing career and competed in his first race at the age of 14. The start of his first year as a professional in 2011 was marred by a knee injury, however a few weeks after returning to competition he took the best result of his season at the Belgian National Road Race Championships, where he finished third behind Philippe Gilbert and Gianni Meersman.

A winner of the Paris–Tours Espoirs in 2010, Wallays won the 2014 Paris–Tours having been in a breakaway that went in the opening kilometres of the  race, making him the only rider to win the under-23 and elite men's editions of Paris–Tours. He added a second victory in the race in 2019.

In 2015, he won the Dwars door Vlaanderen by attacking a group of three other riders a kilometre away from the finish line.

Wallays joined  for the 2016 season, with a focus on working as part of the team's sprint train. He was named in the startlist for the 2016 Vuelta a España.

In October 2020, Wallays signed with the  team for the 2021 season.

Major results

2009
 3rd Overall Kreiz Breizh Elites
 5th Road race, National Under-23 Road Championships
 5th Paris–Roubaix Espoirs
 8th Overall Mi–Août Bretonne
2010
 1st Grand Prix Criquielion
 1st Paris–Tours Espoirs
 5th Omloop Het Nieuwsblad Beloften
 7th Circuit de Wallonie
 8th Ronde van Vlaanderen Beloften
2011
 3rd Road race, National Road Championships
 4th Kattekoers
 5th Internationale Wielertrofee Jong Maar Moedig
 7th Overall Tour of Britain
 10th Grote Prijs Stad Zottegem
2012
 7th Grote Prijs Jef Scherens
 9th Overall Tour de Wallonie
2013
 1st Stage 1 World Ports Classic
 4th Internationale Wielertrofee Jong Maar Moedig
 7th Overall Driedaagse van West-Vlaanderen
 7th Grote Prijs Stad Geel
 7th Grote Prijs Jef Scherens
 8th Overall Post Danmark Rundt
2014
 1st Paris–Tours
 1st Omloop van het Houtland
 3rd Internationale Wielertrofee Jong Maar Moedig
 7th Overall Danmark Rundt
 7th Ronde van Drenthe
 9th Druivenkoers Overijse
 10th Chrono des Nations
2015
 1st Dwars door Vlaanderen
 1st Grand Prix Criquielion
 1st Duo Normand (with Victor Campenaerts)
 4th Overall Tour de Luxembourg
 7th Schaal Sels
 8th Overall Ster ZLM Toer
2016
 1st Grand Prix Pino Cerami
 4th Dwars door het Hageland
 9th Overall Driedaagse van West-Vlaanderen
2018
 1st Stage 18 Vuelta a España
 1st Stage 6 Vuelta a San Juan
 4th Tacx Pro Classic
2019
 1st Paris–Tours
 9th Overall ZLM Tour
2020
 8th Antwerp Port Epic

Grand Tour general classification results timeline

References

External links

 
 
 
 
 

1989 births
Living people
Belgian male cyclists
People from Roeselare
Cyclists from West Flanders
Belgian Vuelta a España stage winners